Mustafa Kocabey (born 6 October 1974 in İstanbul) is a Turkish professional footballer.

Kocabey became a fan favorite with his spectacular goals and his skill as French striker Jean Pierre Papin for Galatasaray fans.

He started his professional career with Galatasaray (1992–94), and he also played for Kocaelispor (1994–95), Dardanel Spor A.Ş. (1995–97), Zeytinburnuspor (1997–98), Kayserispor (1998–99), Yozgatspor (1999-01), Samsunspor (2001–02), Konyaspor (2002–03), Manisaspor (2002–03), Dardanel Spor A.Ş. (2003–04), Kayserispor (2003–04), Erciyesspor (2004–05), Dardanel Spor A.Ş. (2004–05), Etimesgut Şekerspor (2005–06), Dardanel Spor A.Ş. (2006–07), Beylerbeyi S.K. (2007–09) and Turgutluspor (2009–10).

References

External links
TFF.org profile
 

Living people
Footballers from Istanbul
Turkish footballers
Galatasaray S.K. footballers
Kocaelispor footballers
Dardanelspor footballers
Zeytinburnuspor footballers
Yimpaş Yozgatspor footballers
Samsunspor footballers
Manisaspor footballers
Konyaspor footballers
Kayseri Erciyesspor footballers
Turanspor footballers
Beylerbeyi S.K. footballers
Turgutluspor footballers
Balıkesirspor footballers
1974 births
Turkey youth international footballers
Association football forwards